Below are the squads for the Football at the 2009 Southeast Asian Games, hosted by Laos, which took place between 2 and 17 December 2009.

Group A

Cambodia

Malaysia

Timor-Leste

Thailand  
Coach:  Steve Darby

Vietnam

Group B

Indonesia  
Coach:  Alberto Bica

Singapore 
Coach: Terry Pathmanathon

Myanmar 
Coach:  Drago Mamic

Laos 
Coach:  Alfred Riedl

References 

Football at the 2009 Southeast Asian Games